Berling may refer to:

Berling, Moselle, France
Berling (surname)
Berlingr, a dwarf in the short story "Sörla þáttr"

See also
Berlin (disambiguation)
Berlinger (disambiguation)
Berlingske